Russillo is a surname. Notable people with the surname include:

D. Thomas Russillo (1902–1978), American architect
Ryen Russillo (born 1975), American sports journalist